BS 8888 is the British standard developed by the BSI Group for technical product documentation, geometric product specification, geometric tolerance specification and engineering drawings.

History
BS 308 was formerly the standard for engineering drawing since 1927. Over a period of 72 years it was expanded and edited until its withdrawal in 2000. The BSI Group, who produced the standard, played an important role in the development of the international standard on technical specification in conjunction with the ISO. In 2000, the BS 308 was replaced by the updated BS 8888.

3008 update
A significant change in the 3008 revision is that there is no longer a requirement to state whether specifications have been toleranced in accordance with either the Principle of Independency or the Principle of Dependency.

2017 update
This updated version of the standard has been restructured to be more aligned to the workflow of designers and engineers to assist throughout the design process.  The standard now references 3D geometry, not only as drawings but also allowing a 3D surface to be used as a datum feature.

Purpose
BS 8888 performs three fundamental tasks:
Unifying all the ISO standards applicable to technical specification;
Giving an index of ISO standards involved with different principles of technical product specification (TPS);
Providing BSI with a platform for further explanatory commentary where necessary.

References 

http://www.g-tol.co.uk/in1.htm (Iain McLeod Associates)
http://www.roymech.co.uk/Useful_Tables/Drawing/Drawing.html

08888
Technical drawing